The 1985 VMI Keydets football team was an American football team that represented the Virginia Military Institute (VMI) as a member of the Southern Conference (SoCon) during the 1985 NCAA Division I-AA football season. In their first year under head coach Eddie Williamson, the team compiled an overall record of 3–7–1 with a mark of 1–4–1 in conference play, placing seventh in the SoCon. Williamson was hired from Georgia in December 1984 to succeed Bob Thalman as head coach of the Keydets.

Schedule

References

VMI
VMI Keydets football seasons
VMI Keydets football